Mara Pappa Superhero is a 2021 Indian Gujarati-language film directed by Darshan Ashwin Trivedi. Written by Raam Mori, the film stars Abhinay Banker, Shraddha Dangar, Revanta Sarabhai and Bhushan Bhatt in lead roles. The film also stars Bhavya Sirohi, Bharat Thakkar, Priyanka Raja, and Janushi Oza in supporting role. The plot follows the relationship of daughter with her parents. Produced under Saiffron Entertainment, Mara Pappa Superhero is the second film of Trivedi after Mrugtrushna.

Cast
The film's cast include:
Abhinay Banker as Bhavlo
Shraddha Dangar as Teju
Revanta Sarabhai as Yash
Bhavya Sirohi as Kanku
Bhushan Bhatt as Jamburo
Bharat Thakkar as Jeram Mama
Priyanka Raja as Devika
Janushi Oza as Kiara

Plot
The film depicts the relationship of a daughter with her parents. Bhavya has played the role of Kanku who thinks that her father is a superhero.

Production
Raam Mori wrote the original story in Marathi. He later wrote it in Gujarati for the film. It is a second film of Mori after Montu Ni Bittu (2019). The shooting begun on 15 February 2020. The film was shot in Ahmedabad.

Release
The film premiered at London Indian Film Festival in June 2021.

References

External links
 

2020s Gujarati-language films
2021 films
Films shot in Ahmedabad